Jaswantnagar Assembly constituency is a part of the Etawah district of Uttar Pradesh and it comes under Mainpuri Lok Sabha constituency.

Members of Legislative Assembly

Election results

2022

2017

References

External links
 

Assembly constituencies of Uttar Pradesh
Etawah district